The 6th Guam Legislature was a meeting of the Guam Legislature. It convened in Hagatna, Guam on January 2, 1961 and ended on January 7, 1963.

The 6th Guam Legislature was elected in the 1960 Guamanian general election.

Membership

References 

Politics of Guam
Political organizations based in Guam
Legislature of Guam